The following is a list of Kra–Dai peoples in Southeast Asia:

Laos

Nuclear Tai peoples
Tai Daeng
Tai Dam
Tai Gapong
Tai He
Tay Khang
Tai Kao
Kongsat
Kuan (Population of 2,500 in Laos)
Tai Laan
Tai Maen
Northern Thai (Lanna)
Lao (Population of 3,000,000 in Laos)
Lao Lom
Tai Long
Dai (Population of 134,100 in Laos including the Lu people))
Northeastern Thai (including the Lao Kaleun and Isan people)
Tai Nuea
Nùng
Nyaw
Tai Pao
Tai Peung
Phuan (Population of 106,099 in Laos)
Phutai (Population of 154,400 in Laos)
Pu Ko
Rien
Tai Sam
Tayten
Yoy
Zhuang (including the Nùng people)
Shan
Yang
Thai (Central Thai)

Kam–Sui peoples
The Kam–Sui peoples are clustered in China as well as neighboring portions of northern Laos and Vietnam.
 for detailed geographic distribution

Saek people
The center of the Saek population is the Mekong River in central Laos. A smaller Saek community makes its home in the Isan region of northeast Thailand, near the border with Laos.

Thailand

Nuclear Tai peoples
Chiang Saeng
Central Thai (Thai and Khorat Thai)
Northern Thai (Tai Wang, Lanna and Thai Yuan)
Tai Dam
Tai Daeng
Phuan
Tai Song
Lao–Phutai
Lao (Lao Loum, Lao Ga, Lao Lom, Lao Ti, Lao Wiang and Lao Krang)
Northeastern Thai (Tai Kaleun and Isan)
Phutai
Nyaw
Northwestern Tai
Shan
Lu
Tai Nuea (including the Tai Mao people)
Tai Bueng
Tai Gapong
Khün
Lao Ngaew
Nyong
Southern Thai (including the Tak Bai Thai people)
Yoy

Saek people
The center of the Saek population is the Mekong River in central Laos. A smaller Saek community makes its home in the Isan region of northeast Thailand, near the border with Laos.

Vietnam

Nuclear Tai peoples
Buyei
Tày Tac
Tai Chong
Tai Daeng
Tai Dam
Giáy
Tai La
Tsun-Lao
Tai Kao
Lao
Dai
Tai Man Thanh
Nang
Zhuang (including the Nùng people)
Phutai
Tai Taosao
Tay (including the Tho people)
Tai Do (including the Tay Muoi and Tay Jo people)
Tai Yung
Ka Lao
Thu Lao
Tai So
Tai Chiang
Tai Lai
Pu Thay
Tai Hang Thong
San Chay (also referred to as the Cao Lan people)
Lu
Yoy

Kra peoples
The Kra peoples are clustered in the Guangxi, Guizhou, Yunnan, Hunan and Hainan provinces of China, as well as the Hà Giang, Cao Bằng, Lào Cai and Sơn La provinces of Vietnam.

Kam–Sui peoples
The Kam–Sui peoples are clustered in China as well as neighboring portions of northern Laos and Vietnam.
 for detailed geographic distribution

Lakkia people
The Lakkia are an ethnic group clustered in the Guangxi Province of China and neighboring portions of Vietnam, whose members are of Yao descent, but speak a Kra–Dai language called Lakkia. These Yao were likely in an area dominated by Tai speakers and assimilated an early Kra–Dai language (possibly the language of the ancestors of the Biao people.

Burma

Shan (including the Khamti people)
Dai (including the Lu people)
Lao
Tai Khun
Tai Yong
Tai Nuea (including the Tai Mao people)
Tai Laeng
Tai Phake
Thai (Central Thai)
Tai Piw
Tenasserim Thai

Cambodia
Thai (Central Thai) (including the Thai descent in Koh Kong)
Lao
Shan
Kula

Malaysia
Isan
Lao
Thai (Central Thai)
Southern Thai (including the Thai Takbai)

Singapore
Thai (Central Thai)
Lao
Isan
Northern Thai

Assam
 Ahom
 Tai Phake
 Khampti
 Khamyang
 Aiton
 Turung

References

Ethnic groups in Laos
Ethnic groups in Vietnam
Ethnic groups in Thailand
Ethnic groups in Myanmar
Ethnic groups in Cambodia
Ethnic groups in Malaysia
Ethnic groups in Singapore